"Cracklin' Rosie" is a song written and recorded by Neil Diamond in 1970, with instrumental backing by Los Angeles session musicians from the Wrecking Crew, including Hal Blaine on drums, Larry Knechtel on keyboards, Joe Osborn on bass, Al Casey on guitar and Gene Estes on percussion – arranged by Don Randi. The song was included on Diamond's album Tap Root Manuscript. In October 1970 the song became Diamond's first American No. 1 hit within the Billboard Hot 100, and his third to sell a million copies. It was his breakthrough single on the UK Singles Chart, reaching No. 3 for four weeks in November and December. Billboard ranked the record as the No. 17 song of 1970. It also reached No. 2 in both the Australian Singles Chart and the Irish Singles Chart. Its best performance was in New Zealand, where it stayed at No. 1 for five weeks at the end of the year.

The single version released by Uni Records was in mono, while the album version from Tap Root Manuscript was in stereo.

Song meaning
Married to a catchy and dynamic melody and arrangement, the lyrics suggested to some a devotion to a woman of the night:

The stories about how Diamond was inspired to write the song are apocryphal. "Crackling Rosé" is the name of an inexpensive sparkling wine once produced by Andres Wines of British Columbia, Canada, which was popular among the Indigenous population. One story suggests that Diamond heard a story about a native Canadian tribe while doing an interview in Toronto, Canada—the tribe had more men than women, so the lonely men of the tribe would sit around the fire and drink their wine together—which inspired him to write the song.

Charts

Weekly charts

Year-end charts

Certifications

Cover versions 
Mexican singer Roberto Jordán recorded a Spanish language version of the song, titled "Rosa marchita" (English: "Withered rose"). The lyrics of this version depart from the original Neil Diamond lyrics, instead telling a story about a lost love. This version topped the charts in Mexico in 1971.

References 

1970 songs
1970 singles
Neil Diamond songs
Billboard Hot 100 number-one singles
Cashbox number-one singles
RPM Top Singles number-one singles
Number-one singles in New Zealand
Number-one singles in South Africa
Number-one singles in Norway
Songs written by Neil Diamond
Songs about alcohol
Uni Records singles
Song recordings produced by Tom Catalano